Gianluigi Quinzi (born 1 February 1996), is a former tennis player from Italy. On 15 April 2019 he reached his career-high singles ranking of World No. 142 on the ATP World Tour rankings. He reached his career high ranking of No. 1 in ITF Juniors rankings on 1 January 2013.

Quinzi won the 2013 Wimbledon Championships junior boys' singles title, defeating Chung Hyeon 7–5, 7–6(7–2) in the final to claim the championship.

Personal life
Gianluigi was born in Cittadella on February 1, 1996 and grew up in Porto San Giorgio with his mother Carlotta, a ski racer and handball player, and his father Luca, the president of a local tennis club. His parents always get too nervous when their son is playing and as a result they are not present to his games, not even in the junior boy's final of 2013 Wimbledon.

Junior career

Initially Quinzi applied himself to Alpine skiing, gaining a second place in the championships of the Trentino-Alto Adige; but at seven years old, after leaving other sports as well, he focused his efforts primarily on tennis.
At the age of 8 he was noticed by the talent scout Nick Bollettieri who offered him a scholarship to his academy.
He participated at the Little Mo, tournament played in Florida which is reserved for Under-10 players, and triumphed printing his name in the Hall of Fame of a tournament won in the past by players such as Serena Williams and  Andy Roddick. At thirteen years old, he became the youngest player in the ITF Junior rankings and the next year he triumphed in four tournaments in a row with a series of twenty victories.

He started to be known early in Junior ITF tournaments: at age of fourteen - in 2010 - he won the Honduras Junior Bowl, on clay court, by defeating in the final Walner Espinoza 6–0, 6–1, becoming the youngest Italian player to win an ITF Junior tournament. With the excellent results obtained in 2010, Quinzi was nominated Player of the Year, in the category Under-14, by the European Tennis Association; before him, years before, previous nominees for this award have included Andy Murray, Novak Djokovic, Marin Čilić, Gaël Monfils, Kim Clijsters, Justine Henin and Anna Kournikova.

Quinzi obtained his best result in Italy: in Milan he won the Trofeo Bonfiglio in 2012, beating Temür Ismailov in three sets. At the 2012 French Open Junior he was seeded No. 2. He was eliminated in the third round by British tennis player Kyle Edmund; 7–6(1), 1–6, 6–4.
At the 2012 Wimbledon Junior the young Italian, No. 3 seed, arrived in the semifinals where he lost to Luke Saville, who was No. 1 in the Junior ITF rankings and the returning champion from 2011. In September, he reached the 2012 US Open Junior quarterfinals, losing in three sets to the Japanese player Yoshihito Nishioka.

In September 2012, Quinzi entered in the history of Italian tennis: he won the 2012 Junior Davis Cup with Filippo Baldi: the first time in sport history that Italy won the Junior Davis Cup (in 2011 Italy finished runner-up with Quinzi also playing).

On January 1, 2013, Quinzi reached his best ranking of No. 1 in the world in the ITF Junior rankings: he is the first Italian player ever to obtain this result. At 2013 Australian Open Quinzi, seeded No. 2, reached the quarterfinals without losing a set, but there he was defeated by Thanasi Kokkinakis in three sets. In March, Quinzi reached the final of the 43rd Banana Bowl tournament; he lost in three sets to the French player Jean Sebastien Tatlot. The following week he won the 30th Copa Gerdau beating Stefan Kozlov in the final; 6–4, 6–3.

At the second Junior Grand Slam of the season, the 2013 French Open, Quinzi, despite some physical problems, arrived into the quarterfinals, where he lost to No. 2 Nikola Milojević 7–6(2), 6–2. However, one month later, Quinzi, seeded sixth, soon reached the semifinals at 2013 Wimbledon, beating 10th seed Tatlot in the third round (6–1, 6–1), and the same Nikola Milojević who beat him on the French clay, prevailing in the quarterfinals (6–4, 6–3). With an outstanding performance Quinzi beat Kyle Edmund in straight sets to reach his first Junior Grand Slam final. In the final, he defeated the Korean, Chung Hyeon, 7–5, 7–6(7–2). He won the title without dropping a set in the entire tournament. Quinzi was the second Italian in sport history to win here; Diego Nargiso was the first to win the title in 1987.

At 2013 US Open Quinzi reached the quarterfinals but lost to Thanasi Kokkinakis in three sets.

Professional career

2011–2012: Professional debut
In September 2011, Quinzi obtained his first ATP point at the 2011 Mazatlán Open beating the Swiss tennis player Luca Margaroli in the first round. His first best result in ITF Men's Circuit went in 2012 Pozzuoli, where he reached the quarterfinals, but he lost to the Italian player Alessio di Mauro. In September 2012, he reached his first semifinal match in the ITF tournament of Manzanillo, in Mexico, beating, with the score of 6–1, 6–0, the same Yoshihito Nishioka who beat him in the quarterfinals of the 2012 Junior US Open, a week before. In the following two months he also reached the semifinals in other 4 ITF tournaments (Santa Cruz, Santiago, Santa Maria and Lins) often defeating players with a higher ranking and older than him.

On November 23, 2012, he reached is first ITF final in the tournament of Curico,  Chile ($10,000, on clay court), defeating Juan Carlos Saez (world rank No. 464) in the semifinal, but he lost to Guillermo Rivera-Aránguiz in straight sets. Quinzi, at the end of 2012, was world rank No. 561.

2013
In 2013 Quinzi obtained his first big professional result in March: in the first ITF Futures tournament he took part, in Bogotá, he soon reached his second career final, beating high-ranked players than him. Here he lost to Carlos Salamanca (three hundred position ahead of him in the ATP rankings) in straight sets.

In April Quinzi officially entered in the Top 500, becoming the youngest player of the ATP rankings among the first 500. He then received a wild card to enter the main draw of the 2013 Rai Open, the first clay court Challenger tournament of the season played in Italy, but he lost in the first round to former Top 100 player Frederico Gil in three sets. The following week he took part to his second ITF tournament of the season, in Sharm El Sheik; he reached his third career ITF final without losing a set. He lost to Mohamed Safwat in three sets. Two weeks later, again in Egypt, Quinzi reached the semifinals of the F6 Futures tournament on clay court, but he lost to Kevin Krawietz.

At the end of may Quinzi played his fourth ITF tournament of the season, in Casablanca ($10.000, clay). After beating the n.1 seed Sergio Gutierrez-Ferrol (former Top 200 on the ATP rankings) in the quarterfinals, and after receiving a walkover in the semifinals, Quinzi reached his fourth career final in an ITF tournament (the third in 2013, in only four tournaments played). Here he won his first career title beating in three sets  Lamine Ouahab (former world n.114) and entered, for the first time, the Top 400 of the ATP World rankings.

In July, Quinzi received a wildcard to join the main draw of the 2013 Guzzini Challenger: here he reached his first win in a Challenger tournament, beating fellow Italian Stefano Travaglia in three sets, but lost in the second round to Flavio Cipolla former n.70 in the world. In August Quinzi took part to two other Challenger tournaments in Italy but lost in the first round to Italian Top 100 players Filippo Volandri and Paolo Lorenzi. In September Quinzi continued playing in ATP Challenger Tour, taking part to some tournaments in South America: at 2013 Quito Challenger Quinzi lost in the second round to eventual semifinalist Giovanni Lapentti; in Porto Alegre, one week later, he entered the main draw as a qualifier and stunned Gastão Elias (world rank No. 129) in the first round, beating him with a 6–3 6–4. Quinzi then reached for the first time the quarterfinals round on an ATP Challenger Tour tournament, defeating Leonardo Kirche 6–2 6–2, but lost in three sets to Pedro Sousa.

In November, in Colombia, Quinzi beat again Gastão Elias with a stunning 6–2 6–0 to reach the second round of the 2013 Challenger Ciudad de Guayaquil where he overtook Bolivian player Hugo Dellien in straight sets. In the quarterfinals he defeated Michael Linzer to reach for the first time the semifinals in a Challenger tournament; he failed to reach the final losing in three sets to former world rank No. 51 Leonardo Mayer. He finished the season losing to Pavel Krainik in the semifinals of a Future tournament in Mérida, Mexico. At the end of 2013, Quinzi was world rank No. 328.

2014
 
Quinzi started the season in Zagreb where he obtained his first ATP World Tour victory beating Yannick Mertens in straight sets in the qualifying draw of the 2014 PBZ Zagreb Indoors. Anyway, he lost to Peđa Krstin in the following round. Then Quinzi played in Bergamo having received a wildcard into the singles main draw of the 2014 Trofeo Faip–Perrel where he fell in the first round.

In the following months Quinzi took part to other tournaments around the world, without obtaining any significant result: he lost in the first round of the 2014 All Japan Indoor Tennis Championships; then he was defeated by Argentine player Facundo Argüello in the second round of the 2014 Challenger ATP Cachantún Cup and in the first round of the 2014 Rome Open by Taro Daniel.

In May, after the divorce from his coach Eduardo Medica, Quinzi obtained his best results in 2014, capturing three $10,000 ITF tournaments in three weeks - and winning 15 matches in a row: in Galați, Romania, he beat Romanian Vasile Antonescu, in Safi, Morocco, he beat Hugo Dellien 6–2, 6–2 (capturing the title without losing a set) and then in Casablanca he defeated Gianni Mina in straight sets. With these results he got closer to the ATP's Top 300 rankings.

Later in the year, in August, a wrist injury stopped Quinzi's climb of the ATP rankings. After some disappointing results, in November Quinzi reached the quarterfinals of the 2014 Uruguay Open losing in straight sets to Pedro Cachin; he finished the season in Argentina, where he took part at two ITF events in Mendoza (losing to eventual champion Grzegorz Panfil in the semifinals, and falling in the first round the following week). At the end of 2014 (also because of the injury in the second part of the season) Quinzi was world rank No. 424.

2015
At the end of January Quinzi took part at his first 2015 tournament in Palm Coast: playing on clay, the Italian reached the quarterfinals of the $10.000 ITF event, where he was defeated by eventual finalist Patricio Heras. A couple of weeks later, Quinzi won his fifth Future tournament of his career, beating Federico Coria with the score of 6–4, 6–4 on the green clay of Sunrise (Florida). At the 2015 Argentina Open in Buenos Aires he lost to Thiago Monteiro in straight sets in the second round of the qualifying draw; in March the Italian qualified for the main draw of the 2015 Challenger ATP Cachantún Cup but lost in the first round to Juan Ignacio Londero.
Quinzi then obtained a wildcard into the qualifying draw of the Miami Masters, but he was defeated 6–4, 4–6, 6–2 by Thiemo de Bakker.
 
In April he reached the quarterfinals of the 2015 Tennis Napoli Cup as a wildcard beating the No. 3 seed and world No. 104 Blaž Rola 6–3, 6–1 and fellow Italian Flavio Cipolla (former Top 100 player) in straight sets in the first two rounds; he lost to Marco Cecchinato at the third set tiebreak.

2017

After being awarded a wildcard thanks to a qualifying tournament, Quinzi took part in the first edition of the 2017 Next Generation ATP Finals, held in Milan, Italy.

2021: Retirement 
Quinzi retired at 25 years old in July 2021 due to high expectations and competitive stress.

Performance timeline

Singles

ATP Challenger and ITF Futures finals

Singles: 20 (14–6)

Doubles: 4 (2–2)

Junior Grand Slam finals

Singles: 1 (1 title)

References

External links

 
 

1996 births
Living people
People from Cittadella
Italian male tennis players
Wimbledon junior champions
Grand Slam (tennis) champions in boys' singles
Sportspeople from the Province of Padua